Yaduvamsha or Yādava Vaṃśa is a legendary dynasty featured in Hinduism, a cadet branch of the Chandravamsha dynasty. The dynasty's progenitor was Yadu, the eldest son of Emperor Yayati.

Legend

Origin 
In Hindu texts, the king Yayati was cursed by Sage Shukracharya with premature old age due to being unfaithful to his daughter, Devayani. According to a narrative found in the Mahabharata, and the Vishnu Purana, Yadu refused to exchange his years of youth with his father Yayati. So, he was removed from the king's line of succession, inheriting none of his domains. He was excluded from the Somavamsha, better known as Chandravamsha dynasty. Only the dynasty of King Puru, the youngest of the sons of Yayati was entitled to be known as Somavamsha, as Puru had obeyed his father. King Yadu ordered that the future children of Yadu would be known as Yadavas, and the dynasty would be known as Yaduvamsha.

Claimed descent 
Despite the fact that the Yadava clan is stated to be extinguished in Hindu literature, a number of historical clans have claimed descent from this dynasty. Amongst the Yadava clans mentioned in ancient Indian literature, the Haihayas are believed to have descended from Sahasrajit, elder son of Yadu and all other Yadava clans, which include the Chedis, the Vidarbhas, the Satvatas, the Andhakas, the Kukuras, the Bhojas, the Vrishnis and the Surasenas are believed to have descended from Kroshtu or Kroshta, younger son of Yadu.

It can be inferred from the Vamshanucharita (genealogy) sections of a number of major Puranas that, the Yadavas spread out over the Aravalli region, Gujarat, the Narmada valley, the northern Deccan and the eastern Ganges valley. The Mahabharata and the Puranas mention that the Yadus or Yadavas, a confederacy comprising numerous clans were the rulers of the Mathura region. The Mahabharata also refers to the exodus of the Yadavas from Mathura to Dvaraka owing to pressure from the Paurava rulers of Magadha, and probably also from the Kurus.

The Yadava fratricidal war

According to the Mausala Parva (7.185-253) of the Mahabharata a few years after the Kurukshetra War, Andhaka-Vrsni Yadava clans of Dvaraka were destroyed due to a fratricidal war. Both Balarama and Krishna died soon after this war. Later, son of Kritavarma became ruler of Mrittikavati and grandson of Yuyudhana became the ruler of the territory near the Sarasvati River. The rest of the surviving Yadavas took refuge in Indraprastha. Vajra, great-grandson of Krishna was installed as their king.

Vajra is mentioned as the great-grandson of Krishna in the Vishnu Purana. According to a section of this text (IV.15.34-42), he was the son of Aniruddha and Subhadra. But according or another section (V.32.6-7), he was the son of Aniruddha and Usha, daughter of Bana and granddaughter of Bali. Bahu (or Pratibahu) was his son and Sucharu was his grandson. Elsewhere in this text (V.38.34), he was mentioned as installed as king in Mathura instead of Indraprastha.

See also
Chandravamsha
Yadu
Yadava
Vrishni
Krishna

References

Lunar dynasty
Kingdoms in the Mahabharata